Milo Quesada, born as Raúl García Alonso, (16 April 1930 – 12 December 2012) was an Argentine actor.

He started his career in Argentina with the movie Cristol de Hombres and other minor roles. He then moved to Spain, where his career expanded, and obtained several lead roles until the final years of the '70s.

He participated in over 70 movies, including the Italian horror anthology Black Sabbath directed by Mario Bava, where he played the killer in the first part.

Quesada died on 12 December 2012 in Madrid aged 82.

Filmography

Crisol de hombres (1954)
Al sur del paralelo 42 (1955)
Rosaura a las 10 (1958)
Red Cross Girls (1958) - Hugo
Diego Corrientes (1959) - Conde
Un vaso de whisky (1959) - Rafael
My Last Tango (1960) - Carlos Gardel
Fuga desesperada (1961)
Los cuervos (1961) - Chico en fiesta de Laura
La mentira tiene cabellos rojos (1962) - Francisco Soto
The Young Racers (1963) - Italian Driver
The Girl Who Knew Too Much (1963) - De Vico / Paccini
Black Sabbath (1963) - Frank Rainer (segment "Il telefono") (uncredited)
El mujeriego (1964) - Mario
El salario del crimen (1964) - Policía
Saul e David (1964)
Jandro (1965)
Faites vos jeux, mesdames (1965)
My Gun is the Law (1965) - Dave, O'Brien's Henchman
Wild Kurdistan (1965) - Miralai (uncredited)
The 10th Victim (1965) - Rudi
Le solitaire passe à l'attaque (1966) - Brois
Savage Pampas (1966) - Alfonso
Django Does Not Forgive (1966)
Long Days of Vengeance (1967)
I'll Kill Him and Return Alone (1967) - Raul Alonso - Rustler Leader
Django Kill... If You Live, Shoot! (1967) - Bill Templer
The House of 1,000 Dolls (1967) - Man who wants to kill Manderville (uncredited)
Red Blood, Yellow Gold (1967) - Tennessee Logan
Un diablo bajo la almohada (1968) - Miguel
The Mercenary (1968) - Marco (uncredited)
Shoot Twice (1968) - Peter (uncredited)
Rebus (1969) - Gonzalo
Battle of the Last Panzer (1969) - Pierre, Jeanette's husband
Un hombre solo (1969)
A Talent for Loving (1969) - Don Patricio
The Bloody Judge (1970) - Satchel
El coleccionista de cadáveres (1970) - Shanghai
Des vacances en or (1970)
Chicas de club (1970) - Publicista
Capitão Apache (1971)
Dans la poussière du soleil (1972)
El vikingo (1972) - Chófer de don Ramón
Tragic Ceremony (1972) - Cop
El chulo (1974)
Los muertos, la carne y el diablo (1974)
Yo soy Fulana de Tal (1975)
El adúltero (1975)
 Ambitious (1976)

References

1930 births
2012 deaths
Argentine male actors
Male actors from Buenos Aires